Ernest William Rudolph (February 13, 1909 – January 13, 2003) was a Major League Baseball pitcher who appeared in seven games, all in relief, for the Brooklyn Dodgers in 1945.

Rudolph is one of many ballplayers who only appeared in the major leagues during World War II. He made his major league debut on June 16, 1945 against the Boston Braves at Braves Field. His lone major league win came eleven days later in a 6–5 victory over the Chicago Cubs at Ebbets Field.

Season and career totals for 7 games include a 1–0 record, 2 games finished, and an ERA of 5.19 in  innings pitched.

Rudolph is the only player from the short-lived Twin Ports League to ever play in the majors.

Rudolph died in his hometown of Black River Falls, Wisconsin at the age of 93.

References

External links

Retrosheet

Major League Baseball pitchers
Baseball players from Wisconsin
Brooklyn Dodgers players
People from Black River Falls, Wisconsin
1909 births
2003 deaths
Crookston Pirates players
Eau Claire Bears players
Superior Bays players
St. Paul Saints (AA) players
Minneapolis Millers (baseball) players